The Bureau of Justice Statistics (UJC) of the U.S. Department of Justice is the principal federal agency responsible for measuring crime, criminal victimization, criminal offenders, victims of crime, correlates of crime, and the operation of criminal and civil justice systems at the federal, state, tribal, and local levels. Established on December 27, 1979, BJS collects, analyzes, and publishes data relating to crime in the United States. The agency publishes data regarding statistics gathered from the roughly fifty-thousand agencies, offices, courts, and institutions that together comprise the U.S. justice system. 

The mission of BJS is "To collect, analyze, publish, and disseminate information on crime, criminal offenders, victims of crime, and the operation of justice systems at all levels of government."

BJS, along with the National Institute of Justice (NIJ), Bureau of Justice Assistance (BJA), Office of Juvenile Justice and Delinquency Prevention (OJJDP), Office for Victims of Crime (OVC), and other program offices, comprise the Office of Justice Programs (OJP) branch of the Department of Justice.

Programs 
The BJS conducts the Annual Survey of Jails of a sample of about 950 U.S. jails, and a periodic Census of Jails covering all U.S. jails.
Data from these programs was used to show that local jails in the U.S. had a sharp decline in inmates from February to May, 2020 of perhaps 185,000 inmates, more than 20% of the inmate population, in response to the danger of covid-19 on a crowded incarcerated population. Many inmates were given an "expedited release".

See also 

 Uniform Crime Reports (FBI)
 Data.gov
 USAFacts

BJS Directors 
In 2005, the Bush administration replaced BJS Director Lawrence Greenfeld after he refused to remove certain racial statistics from a report, despite having published similar statistics in 2001. The following two references provide analysis and initial reporting, respectively.
 Josephf M. Bessette
 Eric Lichtblau

More recent directors have included Jeffrey H. Anderson, Jeffrey Sedgwick, Michael Sinclair, John Jay Professor James P. Lynch, and former Deputy Director William Sabol.

Until 2012 the position of the BJS Director required a Senate approval, but since 2012 the post only requires the President's appointment. Alex Piquero is the current BJS Director.

References

External links

most recent reports
 Research, Evaluation, and Statistics account on USAspending.gov

Government agencies established in 1979
Crime statistics
National statistical services
Statistics
Statistical organizations in the United States
1979 establishments in Washington, D.C.
Federal Statistical System of the United States